George of the United Kingdom may refer to the following monarchs of Great Britain and later the United Kingdom:

 George I of Great Britain (1660–1727), King of Great Britain from 1714
 George II of Great Britain (1683–1760), King of Great Britain from 1727
 George III (1738–1820), King of Great Britain and later the United Kingdom from 1760
 George IV (1762–1830), King of the United Kingdom from 1820
 George V (1865–1936), King of the United Kingdom from 1910
 George VI (1895–1952), King of the United Kingdom from 1936

See also
 King George (disambiguation)
 Prince George (disambiguation)